LEAP High School is an Area Learning Center (ALC) high school for English Language Learners (ELL) that is part of the Saint Paul Public Schools system in Saint Paul, Minnesota, United States.  It was founded in autumn of 1994 by Jeff Dufresne and Sandra Hall as a high school for newly arrived immigrants to the city of Saint Paul.  Its student body is 100% immigrant and range in ages from 14 to 21.  Its present principal is Rose Santos who has held this office since 2003.

History
"LEAP" stands for Limited English Achievement Program and from 1994 to 2005, LEAP school was known as LEAP English Academy.  However, with the influx of new immigrants from the Wat Tham Krabok refugee camp in Thailand, the name was changed to reflect a more clear image and mission of the school.

The original location of the school was on the 4th floor of the 494 Sibley Avenue building in Saint Paul.  In August 2003 the school was moved to its present location of 631 Albert Street North, where it shared the building with the students and staff of the Wilson Middle School.  During the summer of 2004, with the anticipation of new students arriving to Saint Paul, IA-LEAP was allowed to take over the entire building and, for unrelated reasons, the middle school component was closed.

This building was named after the United States President Woodrow Wilson and dates back to 1924.  Originally, the building was called Woodrow Wilson Junior High School, and has since changed its name several times, such as Wilson High School, Wilson Elementary, Expo Middle School, and variations of the same theme.  Under Federal law, any building named after a president can not be changed or the building defaced without the consent of the Secretary of the Interior, or an act of Congress.
Because of this obstacle, the building will remain "the Wilson building" regardless of the different school name involved.  Mail deliveries have been made to either school name.

Mission and student body
LEAP serves students who are newly arrived immigrants to the United States and have a limited understanding of the English language. But for these students who are pursuing their high school diploma, there is the additional problem of not understanding the background knowledge of a core subject that they would have learned had they been in an American educational system in their early years. Such core subject areas could be, United States and World history, science, economics, mathematics, etc., which may have had a different focus, or even not taught at all in their home countries.  LEAP school focuses on not only the teaching of English, but also at the same time teaching these core subjects in preparation for their high school diploma.

The present student population is approximately 65% Hmong, with the rest of the student representing the Somali, Latino, Liberian, Karen, Laotian, Sudanese, Oromo, Amhara, Filipino, Vietnamese, Latvian, Chinese, Romanian, Arab (United Arab Emirates) and other communities.

References

Further reading

 and the 2006-07 report card

External links
 LEAP High School

1994 establishments in Minnesota
English-language education
High schools in Saint Paul, Minnesota
Hmong-American culture in Minneapolis–Saint Paul
Public high schools in Minnesota